Pasa the Great (died 112, r. 80–112) was the fifth ruler of Silla, one of the Three Kingdoms of Korea.  He is commonly called Pasa Isageum, isageum being the royal title in early Silla. As a descendant of Silla's founder Hyeokgeose, his surname was Bak.

Family 

 Grandfather: King Namhae of Silla
 Grandmother: Lady Unje (알영부인)
 Father: Yuri Isageum
 Mother: Queen Kim, of the Kim clan (부인딸 김씨), daughther of Prince Sayo (사요왕의
 Wife: 
 Queen Saseong, of the Kim clan (사성부인 김씨), daughter of Heoru Galmuwang ( 허루 갈문왕)
 Son: Jima of Silla (died 134, r. 112–134) – was the 6th ruler of Silla

Background

According to Samguk sagi, Pasa Isageum(婆娑尼師今) became king. He is the second son of king Yuri(儒理王). He married Lady sasung(史省).

Pasa Isageum's Pasa(婆娑) is a Buddhist name, meaning 'truth appears' in Sanskrit. However, since it is long before Buddhism was introduced to Silla, it is likely that the Chinese character meaning was added later on. Pasa(婆娑) is rendering of a Chinese character for pronounce
In Nihon Shoki's Empress Jingū part, characters are recorded as different pasa(波沙)(the same pronounce) because they are rendering of a Chinese character, which is more important than the meaning of Chinese characters.
But, it is highly likely that the Japanese Historian's Pasa(波沙寐錦) was confused with Silseong Maripgan the Japanese historian who lacked an understanding of early Silla history.

Reign
In 87, he built Silla's first recorded castles outside of the Gyeongju region.

In 94, when the adjacent Gaya confederacy attacked, Pasa sent 1,000 cavalry to respond. When the Gaya attacked again two years later, he personally led a force of 5,000 to another victory. Pasa was subsequently appeased by an emissary from Gaya, but maintained superiority over the confederacy.

In 101, the Wolseong royal fortress was first constructed.  Portions of this fortress are still preserved in central Gyeongju.

The next year, Silla gained control over the previously independent states of Siljikgok (present-day Samcheok), Eumjipbeol (present-day northern Gyeongju), and Apdok (present-day Gyeongsan).  Six years later he took over the states of Biji (present-day Hapcheon), Dabeol (present-day Pohang), and Chopal (present-day Changwon) as well.

The rival Korean kingdom of Baekje had attacked in 85, but Pasa made peace with Giru of Baekje in 105.

See also
Three Kingdoms of Korea
Proto–Three Kingdoms of Korea
History of Korea
Rulers of Korea
Conquest of Jinhan by Silla
Gaya - Silla Wars

References

The Academy of Korean Studies
Korea Britannica

Silla rulers
112 deaths
2nd-century monarchs in Asia
1st-century monarchs in Asia
Year of birth unknown
2nd-century Korean people
1st-century Korean people